Muhammad Saleh Kamboh Lahori was a noted Mughal calligraphist and official biographer of Emperor Shah Jahan and the teacher of Mughal Emperor Aurangzeb. Though a widely read person, little is known of the life of Muhammad Saleh Kamboh other than the works he composed. He was son of Mir Abdu-lla, Mushkin Kalam, whose title shows him to also have been a fine writer. He is believed to be younger brother of Inayat-Allah Kamboh (Urdu: عنایت خان کمبوہ) and worked as a Shahi Dewan (Minister) with the governor of Lahore. He held the title of Sipahsalar.

As a historian and a poet
Muhammad Saleh is best remembered for his work Amal-i Salih, also referred to as Shah Jahan Namah (The History of Shah Jahan), which he completed in 1659–60 AD. Amal-i-Salih is an account of the life and reign of Shah Jahan. However, the work also includes information on Shah Jahan's predecessors (particularly Akbar and Jahangir) and a compendium of biographies of the Shaikhs, poets, and other notables who were contemporaries with Shah Jahan. It is considered to be one of the most important original sources of events during Shah Jahan's reign.

Muhammad Saleh was known as a poet by the Persian title Kashfi and by Arabic Subhan and is also stated to be an accomplished Urdu singer.

As a soldier
In the list of mansabdars, Muhammad Saleh Kamboh is put down as a commander of five hundred soldiers.

It is claimed by some accounts that Muhammad Saleh Kamboh served as a Mughal Admiral and unfortunately was killed while fighting alongside his fleet against the Ahoms at Pandu on Bengal-Assam border while helping General Abdus Salam, the Faujdar (infantry commander) of Hajo, during the tenure of Islam Khan Mashadi, the Mughal Governor of Bengal. The event referred to above is said to date 1636 AD, which is incorrect, since Muhammadd Saleh was very much alive and is known to have completed his Amal-i Salih in 1659/60 AD soon after Aurangzeb (Reign 1658 AD-1707 AD) became the emperor of India in 1658 AD. According to Naimur Rehman Farooqi, the work was completed in 1669 AD.

It is also stated that when Shaikh Makhdum was appointed imperial "Sadr-us-Sadur"  (Chief Sadr, Chief Administrator or Prime Minister) after death of Sadr Sharif Khan during the reign of Aurangzeb, Muhammad Salih Kamboh was appointed Peshdast (deputy).

Death
The date of Muhammad Saleh's death is not certain. S. M. Latif states on unspecified authority in his works that Muhammad Saleh Kamboh died in A. H. 1085 (1675 AD)  which is accepted by some writers.

A mosque known as Saleh Kamboh Mosque has been built with his name in Mochi Gate, Walled City of Lahore.
He is buried in Lahore, though his grave location is currently disputed by the owners of the property.

See also
 Kamboj in Muslim and British Era
 Lahore
 Mochi Gate
 Mughal Empire
 Shah Jahan
 Walled City of Lahore
 Shaikh Inayat Allah Kamboh

References

Jadunath Sarkar Translation, Maāsir-i-ʻĀlamgiri : a history of the emperor Aurangzib-ʻl̀amgir (reign 1658-1707 A.D.) by Muḥammad Sāqī Mustaʻidd Khān

External links
 http://www.cyberistan.org/misub9495106107.pdf
 http://www.l.u-tokyo.ac.jp/IAS/6-han/database/SouthAsiaBooks.html

Historiography of India
17th-century Indian poets
17th-century deaths
Year of birth unknown
17th-century Indian historians
17th-century Indian biographers